Kevin Can Wait is an American television sitcom starring Kevin James that aired on CBS from September 19, 2016, to May 7, 2018. The series was created by James, Rock Reuben, and Bruce Helford, and marked James' second starring role in a CBS sitcom, following The King of Queens (1998–2007). The show was directed by Andy Fickman.

The series began with James starring as a recently retired Nassau County, New York police officer and father of three, married to Donna (Erinn Hayes). Beginning with the second season, the character of Donna has died, and the series' new female lead is Vanessa Cellucci (Leah Remini), Kevin's former rival on the force and now his partner at their new security company, Monkey Fist Security. While the first season focused on Kevin's personal and family life, the second concerns his new profession, his relationship with Vanessa and his adjustment to life as a single parent.

On May 12, 2018, CBS canceled the series after two seasons.

Plot 
Kevin Gable is a newly retired Nassau County police officer living in Massapequa, New York, on Long Island, with his wife Donna, daughters Kendra and Sara and son Jack Cole. He looks forward to a carefree early retirement hanging out with his friends, who are also retired officers: Goody, Duffy and Mott. However, Kevin soon realizes that his smaller pension paycheck and family challenges will put those plans on hold. His elder daughter Kendra, who was away at college, moves back into town with her unemployed fiancé, Chale, and they begin living in the home's garage; Sara is becoming increasingly difficult, with anger-management issues; and youngest son Jack is a hypochondriac who sees the school therapist for anxiety-related issues.

During the first season, Kevin holds various odd jobs to supplement his retirement income while the family deals with several issues, including Kendra and Chale's wedding. First-season episodes revolve around Kevin and Donna, although Kevin is frequently seen with his group of friends. Most scenes during the first season take place either at the Gable household or the bar Enzo's (where Kendra is employed and Kevin hangs out with his friends).

Season 2 picks up more than a year after the events of the first-season finale. Donna has been dead for about a year, leaving the widowed Kevin with the three kids. He works full-time with his old rival Vanessa Cellucci in their new security company, Monkey Fist Security. With Donna's death, Kevin's reentry into the work force, and the regular inclusion of Vanessa, Season 2 also features more of the supporting characters not seen much in the first season. The Monkey Fist Security office also becomes a frequently used location.

Cast and characters

Main 
 Kevin James as Kevin Gable: Kevin is the patriarch of the Gable household. As the series started, Kevin, a recently retired cop married to wife Donna, solves family problems with his down-to-earth principles and some help from Donna. After Donna's death between the first two seasons, the widowed Kevin becomes a helicopter parent who goes to work at a security firm with his ex-partner, Vanessa Cellucci. Kevin is a generally good man at heart, although he tends to sometimes get distracted in his goals. He cares deeply about his family and friends, and is willing to do most anything to help them.
 Erinn Hayes as Donna Gable (Season 1): Kevin's wife and the matriarch of the Gable household for the first season, Donna is a school nurse until she quits in the first-season finale (also her last physical appearance in the series). Donna dies before the second season. The episode "The Fantastic Pho" reveals that Kevin and Donna had first met at a bar, and "The Might've Before Christmas" reveals that Vanessa urged Kevin and Donna to get together.
 Taylor Spreitler as Kendra Gable-Witt: The elder Gable daughter, Kendra is a 21-year-old college student (she gets into Columbia Law School in the first-season finale) who also works as a waitress at Enzo's. She has the most prominent role of the three Gable children in the series. In the pilot, she reveals her engagement to her parents and moves back in with her fiancé Chale. Kendra is the most responsible and dependable of the Gable kids. She also shows a tendency to nag, particularly at Chale's expense. She plans her wedding during the first season and marries Chale in the Season 2 premiere after he faces deportation. Following the death of Donna, Kendra becomes the surrogate matriarch of the family.
 Ryan Cartwright as Chale Witt: Chale is Kendra's English fiancé and then her husband. He moves into the Gables' garage with Kendra. Chale is shy and soft-spoken, but very intelligent. Kevin is initially hostile to Chale, but their relationship improves over the course of the series. During Season 1, Chale is unemployed but working on an app that he believes will be a huge success. In the Season 2 premiere, Chale marries Kendra as he faces deportation. Chale begins working at Enzo's with Kendra in "Plus One Is the Loneliest Number" and is promoted to manager (and temporarily stops working on his app) in "The Kevin Crown Affair."
 Mary-Charles Jones as Sara Marie Gable: Sara, the younger Gable daughter, has anger-management issues and is somewhat a tomboy, as she excels at and loves sports, watches football and frequently fights. She also has a rebellious streak; she has been suspended, stolen her father's money, created a secret second Facebook account and snuck off with her boyfriend. Despite her hostility, she does love her family. In the first season, Sara appears mostly in short, cameo roles, but she becomes more prominent in the second season.
 James DiGiacomo as Jack Gable: Jack, the Gables' 11-year-old hypochondriac son, is the weakest of the children and somewhat dim-witted. Though he frequently tries to make friends, he finds little success. In the first season, Jack appears mostly in short, cameo roles, but he becomes more prominent in the second season.
 Gary Valentine as Kyle Gable: Kyle, Kevin's older brother, is a firefighter with the New York City Fire Department of below-average intelligence. Kyle is a bachelor and has a crush on Vanessa (much to her dismay). At the fire department, Kyle is mainly a cook who does not actually fight fires often. As a part of Kevin's group, he is frequently seen with Kevin's friends and at the Gable household.
 Leonard Earl Howze as Tyrone "Goody" Goodman: Tyrone is Kevin's friend from the police force. He is married to Didi, who is a good friend of Donna's. In the second season, Goody begins working for Monkey Fist Security.
 Lenny Venito as Duffy (Season 1): Duffy is Kevin's friend from the police force. He has been divorced three times. Duffy was written out in the second season without any explanation for the character's absence.
 Christopher Brian Roach (also credited as Chris Roach) as Mott: Mott is one of Kevin's retired officer friends, and is usually regarded as the dimmest of the group. He is married to Cindy, and has seven young, rambunctious kids. In the second season, Mott begins working for Monkey Fist Security.
 Leah Remini as Vanessa Cellucci (Season 2, Guest appearance in Season 1): Vanessa, Kevin's former partner and rival on the force, is introduced in the two-part first-season finale. Vanessa becomes Kevin's partner in the second episode of Season 2 with her own struggling company, Golden Phoenix Security (later Monkey Fist Security). Vanessa has several exes, many of whom she has dumped for ridiculous and unbelievable reasons.

Recurring 

 Bas Rutten as Rootger Van De Kamp, the Gables' annoying Dutch neighbor who becomes Kevin's friend. He lives with his aunt and his long-term girlfriend. During the first season, he works in the warehouse at a big-box store. In the second season, Kevin and Vanessa hire him at their security company, though they are frequently unable to pay him.
 Jim Breuer as Father Philip, the priest at the Gables' Catholic church.
 Joe Starr as Enzo, the owner of Enzo's, and Kendra's (and later Chale's) boss.
 Saidah Arrika Ekulona as Didi, Goody's wife and a friend of Donna's. She frequently worries about Goody's safety as a cop. (Season 1)
 Chris Weidman as Nick Dawson, a rookie cop who is the new partner of Kevin's former partner. (Season 1)
 Jackie Sandler as Cindy, Mott's wife.

Notable guest stars 
 Ray Romano as Vic Margolis, an annoying hot-tub salesman, whose son befriends Jack ("Beat the Parents") and he and Kevin were old friends.
 Noah Syndergaard as Halloween Viking ("Hallow-We-Ain't-Home")
 Adam Sandler as Jimmy, Kevin's former partner ("Who's Better Than Us?", "A Band Done"); his nephew, Jared Sandler, also guest starred with him ("Who's Better Than Us?")
 Billy Joel as himself ("Kevin's Bringing Supper Back")
 Harry Connick Jr. as himself ("Kenny Can Wait")
 Chazz Palminteri as Vincent Cellucci, Vanessa's critical father ("Plus One Is the Loneliest Number")
 Loni Love as Yvette, a sassy pawn shop owner ("The Owl")
 Florencia Lozano as Wendy, Kevin's neighbor who frequently brings him food after Donna passes away in hopes of winning his affections ("Cooking Up a Storm", "The Whole Enchilada")
 Ricardo Chavira as Frank, Kevin and Vanessa's former co-worker who now owns a rival security company ("Monkey Fist Insecurity", "Delivery Guy")
 Chris Knowings as Omar, a worker at the Corn Dog House that Kevin and Vanessa visit. (Delivery Guy)
 Ali Landry as Lisa, a vivacious single woman whom Kevin meets at the airport on the way to Florida ("Flight or Fight")
 Ralph Macchio as Alviti, a real-estate investor who wants to buy Enzo's and turn the property into a parking lot ("The Smoking Bun", "Phat Monkey")
 Chris Rock as Dennis, a member of Kevin's old band Smokefish ("A Band Done")
 Mike DelGuidice as Ronnie, a member of Kevin's old band Smokefish ("A Band Done")
 Sal Governale as Lance Grafton, a music manager ("A Band Done")

Several members of James' family appear in the series (in addition to James' brother and regular cast member Gary Valentine); his wife Steffiana De La Cruz appears in "The Back Out" and daughters Shea and Sienna James appear in various roles throughout both seasons. Remini's husband Angelo Pagán appears in "Business Unusual."  Theme-song performer Mike DelGuidice and writer Mike Soccio have also appeared in the series in minor roles.

Episodes

Series overview

Season 1 (2016–17)

Season 2 (2017–18)

Production

Development 
In October 2015, it was announced that Kevin James would star in a new family-comedy television series for CBS, with Rock Reuben to be executive producer and Bruce Helford to serve as the showrunner. On May 12, 2016, CBS placed a series order.

The series premiered in the 2016–17 network television schedule and aired at 8:00 p.m. On October 17, 2016, CBS ordered a full season of 22 episodes. In November 2016, Helford exited the series after the first 13 episodes because of creative differences. Cheers alum Rob Long replaced Helford as showrunner.  On January 6, 2017, two additional episodes were added, bringing the season to a total of 24 episodes.

The series was filmed entirely on Long Island at Gold Coast Studios in Bethpage, New York. The pilot episode was filmed on April 1, 2016. Production on subsequent episodes began taping on August 5, 2016.

On March 23, 2017, CBS renewed the series for a second season, which premiered on September 25, 2017, and concluded on May 7, 2018. Season 2's original order was for 22 episodes and was later increased to 24 episodes.

Casting 
In January 2016, Taylor Spreitler was cast as Kendra. In February 2016, Ryan Cartwright, Mary-Charles Jones, James DiGiacomo, Leonard Earl Howze and Erinn Hayes were cast. In March 2016, Lenny Venito and Gary Valentine joined the cast.

In September 2016, it was announced that Ray Romano and Gina Brillon would appear as guest stars. In November 2016, it was announced that Adam Sandler would also appear. In March 2017, it was announced that James' former King of Queens co-star Leah Remini would guest-star in the first season's final two episodes.

In June 2017, Remini was made a series regular starting with Season 2; shortly after, it was announced that Erinn Hayes would not be returning for the show's second season. Sources cited in a Variety article confirmed that Remini would be returning as Detective Vanessa Cellucci, the character she had portrayed in the first-season finale, and that Hayes' dismissal was the result of creative reasons and "not a reflection" of her performance. In August 2017, it was reported that Hayes' character would be killed off before Season 2 began and that the season would take place seven to ten months after Season 1 had ended, in order to make room for Remini.

Cancellation 
On May 12, 2018, it was announced that CBS had officially canceled Kevin Can Wait after two seasons because of declining ratings, CBS's desire to have an ownership stake and the network's need to clear space for three new sitcoms in the Fall 2018 schedule.

Reception

Critical response 
During the first season, Kevin Can Wait received generally negative reviews from critics. On the review aggregator Rotten Tomatoes, the series has an approval rating of 30%, based on 23 reviews, with an average rating of 3.9/10. The site's critical consensus reads, "Kevin James proves a likable, funny lead, but Kevin Can Wait relies too heavily on predictable, unfunny jokes and a series of lackluster subplots to stand out from the crowd." On Metacritic, which assigns a normalized rating, the series has a score 39 out of 100, based on 17 critics, indicating "generally unfavorable reviews."

With the firing of Hayes and addition of Remini in Season 2, the series' retooling also received negative reviews, this time assessing the series as inferior to James and Remini's former show The King of Queens.

Donna Gable's death 

The replacement of Erinn Hayes with Leah Remini and the manner in which the show handled Donna Gable's death have been a source of controversy for the series. Criticism has been levied especially at the episodes "Civil Ceremony" and "Grief Thief." In "Civil Ceremony", the Season 2 premiere, Donna's death is only briefly mentioned via a piece of mail, followed by a joke that many found distasteful. In "Grief Thief", the second season's fifth episode, the characters use a single-parents' support group to avoid work and meet potential romantic partners. The series' scant mention of Donna following her death, the cause of which is never explained, has also been the target of criticism.

Viewers and critics of the show remain divided over the retooling. Some liked the changes, feeling that the chemistry between James and Remini improved the quality of the series. Others said that Hayes' firing, the addition of Remini, the manner in which the show handled Donna's death and poor script quality lowered the show's quality. Despite the division, Hayes and Remini spoke highly of each other. Remini stated that, before Hayes' firing, she was looking forward to working with her again; Hayes (who mostly remained silent over the firing) asked fans to not place blame on Remini.

It has been rumored that the addition of Remini was an attempt to save the show from cancellation, an effort to capitalize on the chemistry between James and Remini and their success on The King of Queens a decade earlier. However, James insisted that the choice was purely creative, as the writers felt that they were running out of ideas, and he was unsure if the show would continue beyond a second season. James also stated that the original plot line of the series was to have him as a single father, but the original producers gave him a wife instead.

Despite the controversy surrounding the revamp, the series' ratings remained steady. As of December 1, 2017, the series was averaging 8.2 million viewers (with delayed viewing) in the season, competing against the more established top-20 series Dancing with the Stars and The Voice. The series also performed well in the much-coveted 18-49 demographic, ranking as the fifth-highest rated program on CBS in that category.

In 2022, Hayes was cast in a role in the AMC dramedy Kevin Can F**k Himself, which was loosely inspired by her dismissal from Kevin Can Wait.

Ratings

Season 1 (2016–17)

Season 2 (2017–18)

Home media 
The complete first season was released on DVD by Sony Pictures Home Entertainment on September 5, 2017, with the second season released in Australia by Shock on May 8, 2019.

See also 
 Heaven Can Wait, the phrase to which the title of the sitcom alludes
 Man with a Plan, another CBS sitcom often compared to and partnered with Kevin Can Wait
 8 Simple Rules, a sitcom also compared to Kevin Can Wait
 Kevin Can F**k Himself, a dramedy inspired by the controversial firing of Hayes

Notes

References

External links 
 
 

2016 American television series debuts
2018 American television series endings
2010s American sitcoms
CBS original programming
English-language television shows
Television series about marriage
Television series about siblings
Television series about widowhood
Television series by CBS Studios
Television series by Sony Pictures Television
Television series created by Bruce Helford
Television shows directed by Andy Fickman
Television shows filmed in New York (state)
Television shows set in Long Island